Tourism in Slovakia offers natural landscapes, mountains, caves, medieval castles and towns, folk architecture, spas and ski resorts.

More than 5.0 million people visited Slovakia in 2017, and the most attractive destinations are the capital of Bratislava and the High Tatras. Most foreign visitors come from the Czech Republic (about 26 percent), Poland (15 percent) and Germany (11 percent). The majority of all visitors are Slovak (60 percent or about three million).

Statistics
Most visitors to Slovakia in who stayed in tourist accommodation establishments come from:

Natural environment

Some 40% of Slovakia is covered with forests. Slovakia’s forests contain a wide biodiversity and animals include brown bears, wolves, foxes, wild boars, muskrats, chamois and lynxes. Slovakia features a high percentage of wildlife included in protected areas. There are hardly any mountain ranges and areas not under some form of protection.

One of Slovakia's main tourist attractions are the Tatra Mountains, (particularly the High Tatras), the highest part of the Carpathians. They feature many rare plant and animal species and offer numerous skiing, hiking and mountaineering opportunities.

Rivers and streams in the mountains of Slovakia are often used for rafting and other white-water based activities and sports. The use of rafts has a very long tradition and especially rafts on the spectacular Dunajec river are very popular among tourists.

Slovakia contains numerous mineral springs and spas. There were 94 destination spas in 2007, which contained more than 11,900 beds. In 2007, there were 276,200 visitors in Slovak spas, which is a 9% increase from 2006. 35.2% of the visitors were foreign.

The spas include:
Balneological spas: Bojnice, Brusno, Dudince, Lúčky, Piešťany, Sklené Teplice, Sliač, Smrdáky, Trenčianske Teplice, Turčianske Teplice
Climatic spas: Nový Smokovec, Štós, Štrbské Pleso, Tatranské Matliare, High Tatras
Mixed spas: Bardejovské Kúpele, Číž, Nimnica, Rajecké Teplice and Vyšné Ružbachy
New water parks are being built throughout the country. Recently built parks include Tatralandia in Liptovský Mikuláš, Aquacity in Poprad and Aquathermal in Senec.

Slovakia's karst areas offer an extremely high number of caves and their list is being expanded every year owing to new discoveries. The number of caves per capita may be the highest in Europe . Thirteen caves are open to the public, the longest of which is 9 km long. Some of them have been proclaimed as UNESCO's World Heritage Sites. Among them, Ochtinská Aragonite Cave is one of three aragonite caves in the world.

Architecture and landmarks

Castles

Slovakia contains many castles, most of which are in ruins. The best known castles include Bojnice Castle (often used as a filming location), Spiš Castle (the largest fortified castle in Europe , on the UNESCO list), Orava Castle, Bratislava Castle, and the ruins of Devín Castle. Čachtice Castle was once the home of the world's most prolific female serial killer, the 'Bloody Lady', Elizabeth Báthory.

Historical architecture

Slovakia's position in Europe and the country's past (part of the multicultural Kingdom of Hungary, the Habsburg monarchy and Czechoslovakia) made many cities and towns similar to the cities in the Czech Republic (such as Prague), Austria (such as Salzburg) or Hungary (such as Budapest). A historical center with at least one square has been preserved in many towns. Large historical centers can be found in Bratislava, Trenčín, Košice, Banská Štiavnica, Levoča, and Trnava. Historical centers have been going through restoration in recent years.

Churches

Historical churches can be found in virtually every village and town in Slovakia. Most of them are built in the Baroque style, but there are also many examples of Romanesque and Gothic architecture, for example Banská Bystrica, Bardejov and Spišská Kapitula. The St. James Church in Levoča with the tallest wood-carved altar in the world and the Church of the Holy Spirit in Žehra with medieval frescos are UNESCO World Heritage Sites. The St. Martin's Concathedral in Bratislava served as the coronation church for the Kingdom of Hungary. The oldest sacral buildings in Slovakia stem from the Great Moravian period in the 9th century.
Very precious structures are the complete wooden churches of northern and northern-eastern Slovakia. Most were built from the 15th century onwards by Catholics, Lutherans and members of eastern-rite churches.

Folklore

Slovakia also has rich folk traditions: songs, dances, folk art, folk costumes and folk and vernacular architecture. Complete historical villages were preserved only in some cases, such as in Čičmany, Vlkolínec (UNESCO site), Brhlovce, Špania Dolina, Osturňa, Podbiel, Stará Hora in Sebechleby, Plavecký Peter, Veľké Leváre, and Ždiar.

Souvenirs and shopping
Typical souvenirs from Slovakia are dolls dressed in folk costumes, ceramic objects, crystal glass, carved wooden figures, črpáks (wooden pitcher), fujaras  (a folk instrument on the UNESCO list) and valaškas (a decorated folk hatchet) and above all products made from corn husks and wire, notably human figures. Souvenirs can be bought in the shops run by the state organization ÚĽUV (Ústredie ľudovej umeleckej výroby - Center of Folk Art Production). Dielo shop chain sells works of Slovak artists and craftsmen. These shops are mostly found in towns and cities.

Prices of imported products are generally the same as in the neighboring countries, whereas prices of local products and services, especially food, are usually lower .

Museums and galleries

Sport

Food and beverage

Food remains relatively cheap compared to Western Europe. Slovakia offers regional wines and beer brands. The most popular wines are from the Tokaj, Little Carpathians, Nitra, Topoľčany and Záhorie regions. Hubert is a Slovak sparkling wine brand and Karpatské Brandy Špeciál is a popular brandy. Demänovka and Horec are traditional herbal liqueurs. Other popular Slovak distilled beverages include slivovica (plum brandy) and borovička, made of juniper berries. Popular beer brands are Topvar, Zlatý Bažant, Šariš, and Corgoň.

Cheese and cheese products (especially bryndza, korbáčik, oštiepok, parenica, and tvaroh cheeses), žinčica are traditional Slovak specialties.

It is voluntary, that if you are satisfied with services in restaurant or in a pub, you can give staff tips, as these are not included in the final bill. It could be up to 10 percent of the total bill.

Objects on the UNESCO World Heritage List

Objects currently on the list:
Banská Štiavnica (a former major mining town) and tajchy (ancient water reservoirs around the town)
Bardejov (a historic town)
Levoča, Spiš Castle and associated cultural monuments
Levoča
Spiš Castle
a medieval ecclesiastical town Spišská Kapitula
frescos in a medieval church in Žehra
Spišské Podhradie
Vlkolínec (folk architecture)
Caves in the Slovak Karst:
Dobšiná Ice Cave
Domica Cave
Gombasek Cave
Jasovská Cave
Krásnohorská Cave
Ochtinská Aragonite Cave
Primeval beech forests in Poloniny National Park and Vihorlat Mountains (localities: Havešová, Stužica, Rožok and Kyjovský prales)
Wooden churches in central and eastern Slovakia (in Hervartov, Tvrdošín, Kežmarok, Leštiny, Hronsek, Bodružal, Ladomirová, Ruská Bystrá)

History 

Tourism in what is today Slovakia began to develop in the mid-19th century when travellers started to visit the High Tatra and Low Tatra mountains.  The first accommodation and catering facilities were built in the late 19th century and this development accelerated after 1918 with the creation of Czechoslovakia.  The number of tourists grew steadily from 270,000 domestic and 45,000 foreign tourists in 1926 to 546,000 domestic and 82,000 foreign tourists in 1936.  The development of the tourist industry slowed down during World War II.  After the introduction of the Communist regime in 1948, Westerners were no longer welcomed in Czechoslovakia, which naturally caused material losses to the tourism industry.  Tourism was controlled by the communist regime ideologically, politically and economically, and the regime failed to invest sufficiently in tourism facilities and infrastructures (with the exception of the High Tatra region). On the other hand, however, since most Czechoslovakian citizens were virtually prohibited from travelling abroad (especially to the West), the regime had to provide more recreational facilities for the population in its own country: In 1989 (at the end of the Communist regime), there were 988 accommodation facilities (389 hotels, 17 motels, 200 hostels, 82 camping sites, 130 cottage camps and other) with 145,822 beds in Slovakia. These were used by some 3.9 m tourists (956,702 from abroad). The biggest tourist centers included Bratislava, High Tatras, Košice, Banská Bystrica and Piešťany. The number of travel agencies (ČEDOK, Tatratour, Slovakotourist, Javorina etc.) was limited by the government.

After the fall of Communism in 1989, Slovakia's tourism began to adapt to the condition of market economy. The facilities were gradually privatised and new facilities have been built, also with the help of foreign capital. Dozens of new travel agencies have been established, and the number of tourist from abroad and income from tourism increased considerably. Passive tourism (Slovaks travelling abroad) increased as well – in the 1990s Slovaks travelled predominantly to the neighbouring countries and Croatia, and since the late 1990s the foreign destinations of Slovaks have shifted to major world tourist destinations (Egypt, France, Indonesia etc.).

Trivia
In 2006, the government of Slovakia formally protested against the film Hostel, stating that the film portrayed Slovakia as a dangerous country with police corruption, where tourists could easily be kidnapped and murdered. The film, the government stated, damaged the image of Slovakia and could be harmful to the tourism industry.

See also
List of castles in Slovakia
List of caves in Slovakia
List of national parks of Slovakia

References

External links

 Slovak national tourism portal
 Official website of the Slovak Tourist Board
 Guided tours in Slovakia
 Resort in Slovakia

 
Slovakia